Ammazzacaffè (Italian for "coffee killer") is a small glass of liqueur usually consumed after coffee to dull its taste or the caffeine effect. It is a common Italian custom, especially after a generous festive meal.

Ammazzacaffè is the popular Italian assimilation and adaptation of a usage born among aristocratic classes, where it was common to move to a different room to smoke and to serve a cognac or brandy after dinner.

Nowadays it is still a common custom in Italy, even at lunch, and it is made of bitters or a local liqueur. In some northern zones (Veneto or Trentino regions) people used to rinse out the emptied coffee cup with liqueur (traditionally Grappa) that they would then drink (resentin); this also happens in Piedmont, where this custom is called pusacaffè (literally "push-coffee").

See also
Caffè
Espresso

References

External links
 "Ammazzacaffè: la guida definitiva". Coffee and news. 

Italian drinks
Italian culture
Coffee liqueurs